Fazila Chiyembekezo is a Malawian footballer who plays as a forward for Rivers Angels and the Malawi women's national team.

Club career
Previously playing for Skippers in Malawi, Chiyembekezo was loaned to Rivers Angels in January 2022.

International career
Chiyembekezo capped for Malawi at senior level during the 2021 COSAFA Women's Championship.

References

External links

1990s births
Living people
People from Lilongwe
Malawian women's footballers
Women's association football forwards
Malawi women's international footballers
Expatriate footballers in Nigeria Women Premier League
Rivers Angels F.C.